Kropia is a municipality in East Attica, Greece and has a land area of 102.0 km2. The soil is very fertile (something common in the Mediterranean) and many crops are grown on it, most importantly vineyards, olives, figs, pistachios, honey and vegetables. Its population was 30,307 at the 2011 census. The seat of the municipality is in the town of Koropi (pop. 19,164). In descending order of population, its other villages are Kítsi (pop. 4,788), Agía Marína (3,765), Karellás (1,579), and Ágios Dimítrios (1,011).

Olympic Air has its head office in Kropia.

References

External links

Official website 

Municipalities of Attica
Populated places in East Attica